A notebook (also known as a notepad, writing pad, drawing pad, or legal pad) is a book or stack of paper pages that are often ruled and used for purposes such as note-taking, journaling or other writing, drawing, or scrapbooking.

History

Early history 
During the fourteenth and fifteenth centuries, notebooks were often made by hand at home by drawing on them into gatherings that were then bound at a later date. The pages were blank and every notekeeper had to make ruled lines across the paper. By the time of the Enlightenment, making and keeping notebooks was such an important information-management technique that children learned its skills in school.

Legal pad 

According to a legend, Thomas W. Holley of Holyoke, Massachusetts, invented the legal pad around the year 1888 when he innovated the idea to collect all the sortings, various sorts of sub-standard paper scraps from various factories, and stitch them together in order to sell them as pads at an affordable and fair price. In about 1900, the latter then evolved into the modern, traditionally yellow legal pad when a local judge requested for a margin to be drawn on the left side of the paper. This was the first legal pad. The only technical requirement for this type of stationery to be considered a true "legal pad" is that it must have margins of 1.25 inches (3.17 centimeters) from the left edge. Here, the margin, also known as down lines, is room used to write notes or comments. Legal pads usually have a gum binding at the top instead of a spiral or stitched binding.

In 1902, J.A. Birchall of Birchalls, a Launceston, Tasmania, Australia-based stationery shop, decided that the cumbersome method of selling writing paper in folded stacks of "quires" (four sheets of paper or parchment folded to form eight leaves) was inefficient. As a solution, he glued together a stack of halved sheets of paper, supported by a sheet of cardboard, creating what he called the "Silver City Writing Tablet".

Binding and cover 

Principal types of binding are padding, perfect, spiral, comb, sewn, clasp, disc, and pressure, some of which can be combined. Binding methods can affect whether a notebook can lie flat when open and whether the pages are likely to remain attached. The cover material is usually distinct from the writing surface material, more durable, more decorative, and more firmly attached. It also is stiffer than the pages, even taken together. Cover materials should not contribute to damage or discomfort.

It is frequently cheaper to purchase notebooks that are spiral-bound, meaning that a spiral of wire is looped through large perforations at the top or side of the page. Other bound notebooks are available that use glue to hold the pages together; this process is "padding." Today, it is common for pages in such notebooks to include a thin line of perforations that make it easier to tear out the page. Spiral-bound pages can be torn out, but frequently leave thin scraggly strips from the small amount of paper that is within the spiral, as well as an uneven rip along the top of the torn-out page. Hard-bound notebooks include a sewn spine, and the pages are not easily removed. Some styles of sewn bindings allow pages to open flat, while others cause the pages to drape.

Variations of notebooks that allow pages to be added, removed, and replaced are bound by rings, rods, or discs. In each of these systems, the pages are modified with perforations that facilitate the specific binding mechanism's ability to secure them. Ring-bound and rod-bound notebooks secure their contents by threading perforated pages around straight or curved prongs. In the open position, the pages can be removed and rearranged. In the closed position, the pages are kept in order. Disc-bound notebooks remove the open or closed operation by modifying the pages themselves. A page perforated for a disc-bound binding system contains a row of teeth along the side edge of the page that grip onto the outside raised perimeter of individual discs.

Preprinting 
Notebooks used for drawing and scrapbooking are usually blank. Notebooks for writing usually have some kind of printing on the writing material, if only lines to align writing or facilitate certain kinds of drawing. Inventor's notebooks have page numbers preprinted to support priority claims. They may be considered as grey literature. Many notebooks have graphic decorations. Personal organizers can have various kinds of preprinted pages.

Uses 

Artists often use large notebooks, which include wide spaces of blank paper appropriate for drawing. They may also use thicker paper, if painting or using a variety of mediums in their work. Although large, artists' notebooks also are usually considerably light, because they usually take their notebooks with them everywhere to draw scenery. Similarly composers utilize notebooks for writing their lyrics. Lawyers use rather large notebooks known as legal pads that contain lined paper (often yellow) and are appropriate for use on tables and desks. These horizontal lines or "rules" are sometimes classified according to their space apart with "wide rule" the farthest, "college rule" closer, "legal rule" slightly closer and "narrow rule" closest, allowing more lines of text per page. When sewn into a pasteboard backing, these may be called composition books, or in smaller signatures may be called "blue books" or exam books and used for essay exams.

Various notebooks are popular among students for taking notes. The types of notebooks used for school work are single line, double line, four line, square grid line etc. These notebooks are also used by students for school assignments (homeworks) and writing projects.

In contrast, journalists prefer small, hand-held notebooks for portability (reporters' notebooks), and sometimes use shorthand when taking notes. Scientists and other researchers use lab notebooks to document their experiments. The pages in lab notebooks are sometimes graph paper to plot data. Police officers are required to write notes on what they observe, using a police notebook. Land surveyors commonly record field notes in durable, hard-bound notebooks called "field books."

Coloring enthusiasts use coloring notebooks for stress relief. The pages in coloring notebooks contain different adult coloring pages. Students take notes in notebooks, and studies suggest that the act of writing (as opposed to typing) improves learning.

Notebook pages can be recycled via standard paper recycling. Recycled notebooks are available, differing in recycled percentage and paper quality.

Electronic successors 
Since the late 20th century, many attempts have been made to integrate the simplicity of a notebook with the editing, searching, and communication capacities of computers through the development of note taking software. Laptop computers began to be called notebooks when they reached a small size in the mid-1990s, but they did not have any special note-taking ability. Most notably Personal digital assistants (PDAs) came next, integrating small liquid crystal displays with a touch-sensitive layer to input graphics and written text. Later on, this role was taken over by smartphones and tablets.

Digital paper combines the simplicity of a traditional pen and notebook with digital storage and interactivity. By printing an invisible dot pattern on the notebook paper and using a pen with a built in infrared camera the written text can be transferred to a laptop, mobile phone or back office for storage and processing.

See also 
 Commonplace book
 Desk pad
 Exercise book
 Fieldnotes
 Palm leaf manuscript
 Writing material

References 

 
Stationery
Australian inventions